Dominion of Canada can refer to:

 Canada, historically referred to as "Dominion of Canada" from Confederation until the 1950s
 Name of Canada
 Dominion of Canada Rifle Association, the national rifleman's association of Canada
 Dominion of Canada General Insurance Company, former life assurance company in Canada
 Dominion of Canada Northern Ontario Men's Curling Championship, former name of the NOCA Men's Provincial Championship